The women's team racquetball competition at the 2019 Pan American Games in Lima, Peru was held between August 7 to 10, 2019 at the Racquetball courts located at the Villa Deportiva Regional del Callao cluster.  Mexico won gold in the Women's Team event, and it was their third consecutive Women's Team gold in Racquetball at the Pan American Games.

Schedule
All times are Central Standard Time (UTC-6).

Results

Playoffs

Final standings

References

External links
Results book

Racquetball at the 2019 Pan American Games